The Galleries may refer to:

in England
 The Galleries, Bristol, a shopping mall
 Galleries Shopping Centre, Washington
 The Galleries (Wigan), a shopping centre
in the United States
The Galleries (Vicksburg, Mississippi), listed on the NRHP in Mississippi

See also
Gallery (disambiguation)